Ankush Chaudhari (Marathi pronunciation: [əŋkuʃ t͡səu̯dʱəɾiː]) is an Indian film actor, screenwriter, director, producer and theatre personality known for his works in Marathi cinema. Ankush is known as one of the most successful actors in marathi cinema.

Career
In 2015, Ankush Chaudhari portrayed the character of college student named Satya in the film Classmates directed by Aditya Sarpotdar. In August his romantic drama film Double Seat released opposite Mukta Barve and directed by Sameer Vidwans. It got positive reviews from critics and viewers. The movie became one of the highest grossers of 2015 for Marathi cinema. In October his action crime thriller Daagdi Chaawl releases opposite Pooja Sawant and directed by debutant Chandrakant Kanse. Daagdi Chaawl completed his hat-trick of blockbuster film for the year 2015. The Song "Dhaga Dhaga" become popular among music lovers by topping the music charts.

Personal life
He is married to Deepa Parab. The couple was seen at premier of Duniyadari in 2013.

Filmography

Films

Television

References

External links
 

Living people
Male actors from Mumbai
Indian male soap opera actors
Indian male comedians
Male actors in Marathi theatre
Male actors in Marathi cinema
1977 births